Innotas is an IT project portfolio management (PPM) software from Planview for maturing organizations.

Innotas was originally founded in 2006 as a cloud portfolio management company headquartered in San Francisco, California. Innotas is a cloud-based software for IT and new product development organizations.

Innotas is primarily used by the project management office (PMO) and new product development organizations.

Acquisition by Planview 
On August 1, 2016, Planview announced the acquisition of Innotas.

Analyst recognition 

Planview has been designated as a "Leader" in the first edition of the May 2017 Gartner "Magic Quadrant for Project Portfolio Management, Worldwide." Gartner evaluated Planview based on the company’s PPM-related products, which include Planview Enterprise (strategic portfolio and resource management), Innotas (PPM for maturing organizations), and Projectplace (collaborative work management).

References

Project management software
Proprietary software